
 

Cape Douglas is a locality in the Australian state of South Australia located on the state’s south-east coast overlooking the body of water known in Australia as the Southern Ocean and by international authorities as the Great Australian Bight.

Its boundaries were created on 31 October 1996 for the ‘long established name’ which is considered by the relevant government agency as being named after Douglas Point, a coastal feature within the locality’s boundaries and which was renamed as Cape Douglas on  18 January 1996 “to agree with the long established locally used name of the feature.”  The following shack sites have been included within the locality - the Cape Douglas Shack Site, also known as the Douglas Point Shack Site, and the Middle Point Shack Site.

Cape Douglas consists of land along the coastline extending from Jones Bay in the west to the Middle Point Headland in the east and including the following features  - the Cape Douglas headland and Umpherstone Bay on its eastern side.

The land use within the locality is dominated by agriculture with land adjoining the coastline which includes the protected area known as the Douglas Point Conservation Park being zoned for conservation and an area overlooking Umpherstone Bay being zoned for residential use.

The 2016 Australian census which was conducted in August 2016 reports that Cape Douglas had a population of 58 people.

Cape Douglas is located within the federal division of Barker, the state electoral district of Mount Gambier and the local government area of the District Council of Grant.

References

Towns in South Australia
D